The 2018–19 Drexel Dragons men's basketball team represented Drexel University during the 2018–19 NCAA Division I men's basketball season. The Dragons, led by third-year head coach Zach Spiker, played their home games at the Daskalakis Athletic Center in Philadelphia, Pennsylvania as members of the Colonial Athletic Association.  They finished the season 13–19, 7–11 in CAA play to finish in a tie for sixth place. They were defeated in the quarterfinals of the 2019 CAA men's basketball tournament by College of Charleston.

Previous season

The Dragons finished the 2017–18 season 13–20,  6–12 in CAA play to finish in a tie for 7th place. They lost to Charleston in the CAA tournament.

Offseason

Departures

Incoming transfers

2018 recruiting class

Class of 2019 early commitments

Preseason 
In a poll of the league coaches, media relations directors, and media members at the CAA's media day, Drexel was picked to finish in ninth place in the CAA. Junior guard Kurk Lee was named as an honorable mention to the preseason All-Conference team.

Roster

On February 23, 2019, Drexel announced that guard Troy Harper broke his foot during practice earlier in the week, and would miss the remainder of the season.

Schedule and results

|-
!colspan=12 style=| Exhibition
|-

|-
!colspan=12 style=| Non-conference regular season
|-

|-
!colspan=12 style=| CAA regular season
|-

|-
!colspan=12 style=| CAA Tournament
|-

Team statistics
As of the end of the season. 
 Indicates team leader in each category. 
(FG%, FT% leader = minimum 50 att.; 3P% leader = minimum 20 att.)

Awards
James Butler
"Sweep" Award (team leader in blocks)

Alihan Demir
CAA All-Conference Third Team

Troy Harper
CAA All-Conference Third Team
Samuel D. Cozen Award (most improved player)

Trevor John
Donald Shank Spirit & Dedication Award

Matej Juric
Dragon "D" Award (team's top defensive player)
Team Academic Award

Kurk Lee
Preseason CAA All-Conference Honorable Mention

Camren Wynter
Kyle Macy Freshman All-America Team
CAA Rookie of the Year
CAA All-Rookie Team
CAA Rookie of the Week (5)
Team Most Valuable Player
Assist Award (team leader in assists)

See also
 2018–19 Drexel Dragons women's basketball team

References

Drexel Dragons men's basketball seasons
Drexel
Drexel
Drexel